Libertia grandiflora, the tukauki or mikoikoi, is a flowering plant in the family Iridaceae. The species is endemic to New Zealand. The Latin grandiflora means large flowered.

In cultivation this plant requires a sunny, sheltered location and protection from winter frosts. It has gained the Royal Horticultural Society's Award of Garden Merit.

References

grandiflora
Flora of New Zealand